Thomas Edward Taylor (17 March 1811 – 3 February 1883), was a British Conservative Party politician. He served as Chancellor of the Duchy of Lancaster in 1868 and between 1874 and 1880 under Benjamin Disraeli.

Background and education
Taylor was the eldest son of Reverend Edward Taylor, fourth son of Thomas Taylor, 1st Earl of Bective (whose eldest son was created Marquess of Headfort in 1800). His mother was Marianne St Leger, daughter of the Honourable Richard St Leger. One of his two brothers, General Sir Richard Taylor (1819–1904) enjoyed a distinguished career in the British Army. He was educated at Eton.

Military career
Taylor was commissioned into the 6th Dragoon Guards in 1829. He was promoted lieutenant in 1831 and captain in 1838, but retired from the army in 1846.

Political career
In 1841 Taylor was elected Member of Parliament for Dublin County, a seat he would hold for the rest of his life. He was an opposition whip from 1855 to 1858, and then served as a Lord of the Treasury (government whip) from 1858 to 1859 in the second administration of the Earl of Derby. When the Conservatives returned to power in 1866, Derby appointed Taylor Parliamentary Secretary to the Treasury, a post he held until 1868, the last year under the premiership of Benjamin Disraeli. He then served briefly under Disraeli as Chancellor of the Duchy of Lancaster from November to December 1868. The latter year he was also admitted to the Privy Council.

In the 1874 general election Taylor decisively defeated Charles Stewart Parnell, and was once again appointed Chancellor of the Duchy of Lancaster by Disraeli, which he remained until the Conservatives fell from power in 1880.

Family
Taylor married Louisa, daughter of Hugh Francis Tollemache, in 1862, at the age of 51. They had five children, three sons and two daughters. Taylor died on 3 February 1883, aged 71. Louisa died in April 1928.

See also
Marquess of Headfort
Baron Langford

References

External links

1811 births
1883 deaths
Carabiniers (6th Dragoon Guards) officers
Chancellors of the Duchy of Lancaster
Irish Conservative Party MPs
Irish unionists
Members of the Privy Council of the United Kingdom
Members of the Parliament of the United Kingdom for County Dublin constituencies (1801–1922)
People educated at Eton College
UK MPs 1841–1847
UK MPs 1847–1852
UK MPs 1852–1857
UK MPs 1857–1859
UK MPs 1859–1865
UK MPs 1865–1868
UK MPs 1868–1874
UK MPs 1874–1880
UK MPs 1880–1885
Thomas Edward